The African Investment Bank (AIB) is one of three financial institutions of the African Union (AU) along with the African Monetary Fund and the African Central Bank. It will be headquartered in Tripoli, Libya.

Background

The Lome Summit (2000) adopted the Constitutive Act of the African Union, which specifies the objectives, principles, and organs of the AU. Twenty-seven African countries signed the act, which provided for establishing a wide variety of institutions, including the Pan-African Parliament; Court of Justice; African Central Bank; African Monetary Fund; and African Investment Bank. In 2005, the AU held a meeting of independent experts in Addis Ababa, Ethiopia, to consider concept papers and draft Protocols prepared by the African Union Commission (AUC) regarding the three institutions. The AU also determined seats for the financial institutions, the African Central Bank (Nigeria), the African Investment Bank (Libya), and the African Monetary Fund (Central Africa).

Mandate and Principles Governing Operations

On 21 November 2006, the AUC held a meeting in Yaounde, Cameroon, to outline the implementation of the three African Financial Institutions as per Article 19 of the Constitutive Act. The AIB's mandate was envisioned to aid in fostering economic growth and accelerating economic integration in Africa in line with the AU's Strategic Plan. Article 17 of the Agreement further established that AIB's method of banking operations will be conducted in accordance with the following governing principles:

Operations are principally for financing specific projects, including national, sub-regional or regional development schemes for members. May include financing to national development institutions in Africa serving the mandate;
In selecting projects, evaluate its potential contribution to the mandate, rather than project type;
AIB will not finance any undertaking in a member's territory if that member objects;
In considering loan or guarantee applications, consider the borrower's ability to obtain financing or facilities elsewhere;
In making or guaranteeing loans, consider if the borrower & its guarantor can meet obligations; and that the interest rate, other charges & the repayment schedule is appropriate;
Proceeds can only be used for procurement in member states of goods produced by members, except if the Board of Directors permits non-member procurement, or non-member produced goods, in special circumstances (i.e., non-member provides significant financing to AIB);
In the case of a direct loan, the borrower can draw funds only for project expenditures as incurred;
Take measures to ensure that loan proceeds are used only for the purposes which the loan was granted;
Avoid a disproportionate amount of resources benefiting any member;
Seek reasonable diversification in equity capital investment; AIB will not assume management of any entity or enterprise in which it has an investment, except where necessary;
Apply sound banking principles, particularly to investments in equity capital;
In guaranteeing loans made by other investors, AIB shall receive suitable risk compensation.

Membership
According to Article 4, AIB membership is open to all AU members. Eligible countries who do not become members when operations begin may be subsequently admitted, under terms and conditions established by the Board of Governors (BOG), following the affirmative vote of at least four-fifths of the Governors, representing not less than three-fourths of the member's total voting power.

Capital
AIB's initial authorized capital stock has yet to be determined. It will be divided into a number of shares with a specific par value, which shall be available to members for subscription in accordance with the provisions in the Agreement. The authorized capital stock shall be divided into paid-in shares and callable shares. The BOG will occasionally determine the proportion of authorized capital in paid-in shares and callable shares. The BOG may increase the authorized capital stock, under terms and conditions deemed advisable. The BOG's decision to increase the authorized capital will be adopted by a vote of at least four-fifths of the Governors, representing not less than three-fourths of the member's total voting power.

Notes

References

Agreement Establishing the AIB
M. Mkwezalamba, CAMEF II 2006
M. Mkwezalamba, CAMEF 2007
Inventory of International Nonproliferation Organizations and Regimes: AU Profile Center for Nonproliferation Studies 9-27-2006
Menas Libya Politics & Security 12-13-06

Organs of the African Union
Banks of the African Union
Banks of Libya